The 2013 Royal Bank Cup was the 43rd Junior "A" ice hockey National Championship for the Canadian Junior Hockey League. The 2013 Royal Bank Cup marks the 43rd consecutive year a national championship has been awarded to this skill level since the breakaway of Major Junior hockey in 1970.

The five competitors competing in the Royal Bank Cup included the host Summerside Western Capitals, the winners of the Fred Page Cup (Truro Bearcats), Dudley Hewitt Cup (Minnesota Wilderness), and the top two teams from the Western Canada Cup (Champion Surrey Eagles and runner-up Brooks Bandits).

The tournament was hosted by the Summerside Western Capitals which saw the round robin begin on May 11, 2013 and the final played on May 19, 2013. Tournament games were played at the Consolidated Credit Union Place in Summerside, Prince Edward Island.

History
The Royal Bank Cup in 2013 presented three historical moments.  The Minnesota Wilderness, in having won the Dudley Hewitt Cup, became the first American club to compete at the Royal Bank Cup.  Secondly, the 2013 final, for the first time ever, involved two teams that were not regional champions.  The Summerside Western Capitals lost the Fred Page Cup to the Truro Bearcats but hosted the Royal Bank Cup, while the Brooks Bandits lost the Western Canada Cup to the Surrey Eagles and were admitted as runner-up by defeating the Yorkton Terriers due to the page playoff system.  Additionally, as Brooks won the cup, they became the first team to win it without being a regional champion or host.

Teams
Summerside Western Capitals (Host)
Regular Season: 43-7-2-0 (1st Overall)
Playoffs: Defeated Miramichi 4-0, Defeated Woodstock 4-0, Defeated Truro 4-1 (MHL Champions), Fred Page Cup Runner-up (3-2).

Truro Bearcats (Fred Page Cup)
Regular Season: 38-9-0-5 (2nd Overall)
Playoffs: Defeated Pictou County Crushers 4-3, Defeated Amherst Ramblers 4-2, Lost to Summerside Western Capitals 4-1 (MHL Runner-up), Won Fred Page Cup (4-0).

Surrey Eagles (Western Canada Cup Winner)
Regular Season: 35-13-3-5 (1st Overall)
Playoffs: Defeated Langley 3-1, Defeated Chilliwack 3-0, Defeated Alberni Valley 4-0, Defeated Penticton 4-2 (BCHL Champions), Won Western Canada Cup (4-1).

Brooks Bandits (Western Canada Cup Runner-up)
Regular Season: 53-4-3 (1st Overall)
Playoffs: Defeated Drumheller 4-1, Defeated Okotoks, Defeated Spruce Grove 4-1 (AJHL Champions), Western Canada Cup Runner-up (4-2).

Minnesota Wilderness (Dudley Hewitt Cup)
Regular Season: 51-3-0-2 (1st Overall)
Playoffs: Defeated Minnesota Iron Rangers 4-0, Defeated Fort Frances Lakers 4-2 (SIJHL Champions), Won Dudley Hewitt Cup (3-1).

Tournament

Round Robin

(x-) Denotes semi-final berth.

Results
All games played at the Consolidated Credit Union Place, in Summerside, P.E.I   .

Semi-final

Final

Awards
Roland Mercier Trophy (Tournament MVP): Cam Maclise (Brooks Bandits)
Top Forward: Adam Tambellini (Surrey Eagles)
Top Defencemen: Devon Toews (Surrey Eagles)
Top Goaltender: Kevin Bailie (Summerside Western Capitals)
Tubby Smaltz Trophy (Sportsmanship): Mike Dietrich (Minnesota Wilderness)
Top Scorer: Anthony Paskaruk (Brooks Bandits)

Roll of League Champions
AJHL: Brooks Bandits
BCHL: Surrey Eagles
CCHL: Cornwall Colts
MHL: Summerside Western Capitals
MJHL: Steinbach Pistons
NOJHL: North Bay Trappers
OJHL: St. Michael's Buzzers
QJAAAHL: Longueuil College Francais
SJHL: Yorkton Terriers
SIJHL: Minnesota Wilderness

See also
Canadian Junior A Hockey League
Royal Bank Cup
Western Canada Cup
Dudley Hewitt Cup
Fred Page Cup

References

External links
Royal Bank Cup Website

2013
Royal Bank Cup
Royal Bank Cup